Partial general elections were held in Luxembourg on 3 June 1928, electing 28 of the 52 seats in the Chamber of Deputies in the south and east of the country. The Party of the Right won 13 of the 28 seats, and saw its total number of seats rise from 22 to 24.

Results

By constituency

References

Chamber of Deputies (Luxembourg) elections
Legislative election, 1928
Luxembourg
1928 in Luxembourg
June 1928 events
Election and referendum articles with incomplete results